The Pingxiang North railway station is a railway station located in Pingxiang, in the western Jiangxi province, People's Republic of China, serving the Hangzhou–Changsha High-Speed Railway. The planned Changsha–Ganzhou high-speed railway will also stop here.

References

Railway stations in Zhejiang